The 2022–23 Duleep Trophy, also known as Mastercard Duleep trophy due to sponsorship reasons, was the 59th season of the Duleep Trophy, a first-class cricket tournament in India. It started from 8 September 2022. The zonal format of the tournament returned after 2014-15 season. The tournament was played across Tamil Nadu and Puducherry. In the final, West Zone defeated South Zone by 294 runs to win their 19th title.

Squads

Fixtures

Quarter-finals

Semi-finals

Final

References

External links
 Series home at ESPN Cricinfo

Duleep Trophy seasons
Duleep Trophy
Duleep Trophy
Duleep Trophy Final